The 2022 Curling Stadium Martensville International was held from September 1 to 5 at the Martensville Curling Club in Martensville, Saskatchewan. The event was held in a round robin format with a purse of $22,250 on the men's side and $25,000 on the women's side.

The event was sponsored by Curling Stadium, a streaming service provided by CurlingZone. All of the games were streamed on CurlingZone YouTube page.

Men

Teams
The teams are listed as follows:

Round-robin standings
Final round-robin standings

Round-robin results 
All draw times are listed in Central Time (UTC−06:00).

Draw 1
Thursday, September 1, 5:00 pm

Draw 2
Thursday, September 1, 8:30 pm

Draw 3
Friday, September 2, 9:00 am

Draw 4
Friday, September 2, 12:30 pm

Draw 5
Friday, September 2, 5:00 pm

Draw 6
Friday, September 2, 8:30 pm

Draw 7
Saturday, September 3, 9:00 am

Draw 8
Saturday, September 3, 12:30 pm

Draw 9
Saturday, September 3, 5:00 pm

Draw 10
Saturday, September 3, 8:30 pm

Draw 11
Sunday, September 4, 9:00 am

Draw 12
Sunday, September 4, 12:30 pm

Draw 13
Sunday, September 4, 5:00 pm

Draw 14
Sunday, September 4, 8:30 pm

Playoffs

Source:

Quarterfinal
Monday, September 5, 9:00 am

Semifinals
Monday, September 5, 12:30 pm

Final
Monday, September 5, 4:00 pm

Women

Teams
The teams are listed as follows:

Round-robin standings
Final round-robin standings

Round-robin results 
All draw times are listed in Central Time (UTC−06:00).

Draw 1
Thursday, September 1, 5:00 pm

Draw 2
Thursday, September 1, 8:30 pm

Draw 3
Friday, September 2, 9:00 am

Draw 4
Friday, September 2, 12:30 pm

Draw 5
Friday, September 2, 5:00 pm

Draw 6
Friday, September 2, 8:30 pm

Draw 7
Saturday, September 3, 9:00 am

Draw 8
Saturday, September 3, 12:30 pm

Draw 9
Saturday, September 3, 5:00 pm

Draw 10
Saturday, September 3, 8:30 pm

Draw 11
Sunday, September 4, 9:00 am

Draw 12
Sunday, September 4, 12:30 pm

Draw 13
Sunday, September 4, 5:00 pm

Draw 14
Sunday, September 4, 8:30 pm

Playoffs

Source:

Quarterfinals
Monday, September 5, 9:00 am

Semifinals
Monday, September 5, 12:30 pm

Final
Monday, September 5, 4:00 pm

Notes

References

External links
Men's Event
Women's Event

2022 in Canadian curling
2022 in curling
Curling in Saskatchewan
September 2022 sports events in Canada
2022 in Saskatchewan
Martensville